Scarborough North is a federal electoral district in Toronto, Ontario.

Scarborough North was created by the 2012 federal electoral boundaries redistribution and was legally defined in the 2013 representation order. It came into effect upon the call of the 42nd Canadian federal election on 19 October 2015. It was created out of parts of the electoral districts of Scarborough—Rouge River (92%) and Scarborough—Agincourt (8%).

Geography
The riding consists of the northern part of the Scarborough district of Toronto. It contains the neighbourhoods of Agincourt (east of Midland Avenue), Milliken (east of Midland Avenue), Morningside Heights (Brookside), and Malvern (west of Neilson Road).

Demographics
According to the Canada 2021 Census

Ethnic groups: 42.2% Chinese, 26.8% South Asian, 8.2% Black, 7.5% White, 6.8% Filipino, 1.0% Southeast Asian, 1.0% Latin American
Languages: 30.0% English, 20.9% Cantonese, 12.3% Mandarin, 8.6% Tamil, 3.6% Tagalog, 2.4% Urdu, 2.2% Gujarati, 1.1% Punjabi
Religions: 33.0% Christian (16.1% Catholic, 1.5% Christian Orthodox, 1.4% Anglican, 1.2% Pentecostal, 1.1% Baptist, 11.7% Other), 14.7% Hindu, 9.2% Muslim, 4.5% Buddhist, 1.2% Sikh, 36.6% None
Median income: $30,400 (2020) 
Average income: $38,560 (2020)

Members of Parliament

This riding has elected the following Members of Parliament:

Election results

References

Ontario federal electoral districts
Federal electoral districts of Toronto
Scarborough, Toronto
2013 establishments in Ontario